Hydroxycoumarin may refer to:

4-Hydroxycoumarin
7-Hydroxycoumarin (umbelliferone)